This is a list of transfers in Serbian football for the 2010 summer transfer window. Only moves featuring a Serbian Superliga side are listed.
If adding transfers, please add the external source in references list, at bottom.

Serbian Superliga

Partizan Belgrade

In:

Out:

Red Star Belgrade

In:

Out:

OFK Beograd

In:

Out:

Spartak ZV Subotica

In:

Out:

FK Vojvodina

In:

Out:

FK Jagodina

In:

Out:

Javor Ivanjica

In:

Out:

Rad Belgrad

In:

Out:

Metalac G.M.

In:

Out:

FK Smederevo

In:

Out:

Borac Čačak

In:

Out:

BSK Borča

In:

Out:

Čukarički Stankom

In:

Out:

Hajduk Kula

In:

Out:

FK Inđija

In:

Out:

Sloboda Point Sevojno

In:

Out:

See also
Serbian Superliga
Serbian Superliga 2009–10
List of foreign football players in Serbia
List of Serbian football transfers winter 2009–10
List of Serbian football transfers summer 2009

References

Sources 
 Serbian Superliga official website
 Jelen Superliga 2010/2011 at Moj Sport.
 Football news at Sportske.net.
 MTSMondo.com, Serbian news agency
 Superliga in Sportski Žurnal.
 Srbijafudbal

Serbian
2010
2010–11 in Serbian football